Brian Setencich (born March 29, 1962) served in the California Assembly for one term from 1994 to 1996 and as Speaker of that body from September 14, 1995, to January 4, 1996. Setencich, a Republican, was the first freshman legislator to serve as Speaker of the Assembly in more than a century. He was previously a city councilman in Fresno and played professional basketball in Europe.

Early years 
Setencich was born in Fresno, California where he attended local public schools and played basketball for his high school team. After playing collegiately at Cal State-Bakersfield, Setencich went on to play professional basketball in Europe prior to starting his political career. For much of his adult life he has made a home in California residing primarily in Sacramento and San Francisco.

Education 
Setencich is an alumnus of Fresno High School in Fresno, California and California State University Bakersfield in Bakersfield, California. He played collegiate basketball for the University of San Diego, where he earned the WCC Scholar-Athlete Award for 1982–83, and went on to play for Cal State Bakersfield's Roadrunners men's basketball team, where he placed on that university's All-Time Roster for 1984 and 1985.

Political career 
Fresno City Councilman

Setencich began his political career as a Fresno City Councilmember from 1991 to 1994 representing District 1 (west-central Fresno). Though a political unknown at the time, he managed to raise over $200,000 to upset incumbent and win the election. He was the first Fresno City Councilmember to successfully run for higher office.

1994 California Assembly

Setencich was elected to the California State Assembly in 1994 as a Republican representing the 30th Assembly District, encompassing the extreme southern San Francisco Bay Area, inland Monterey Bay Area, and parts of the northern Central Coast. The district is defined by major agricultural areas such as the Pajaro Valley and the Salinas Valley.  He served as a member of the California Assembly's Higher Education Committee, as well as the Water, Parks & Wildlife and Banking and Finance Committees. 

Speaker of the California Assembly

In 1995, he was the [Majority] Speaker Pro Tem for the California State Assembly. Setencich was the first freshman legislator to serve as Speaker of the Assembly since Thomas J. White and held the office from 1995 to 1996.  He was elected Speaker after Doris Allen was recalled.

1996 Re-election Campaign Run
Setencich ran for re-election as an incumbent, but lost. In the primary election of 1996, Setencich was defeated for renomination by Republican Robert Prenter who defeated Setencich again in November when Setencich ran as a write-in candidate.

Post Political Career 
After his political career in the state capital, Setencich relocated to San Francisco. He was Special Assistant to the Mayor for Emergency Communications (a.k.a. 911 Emergency Response Project and later to be known as the Department of Emergency Response), for the City and County of San Francisco between 1997 and 2004. This department began with the successful campaign for federal and state funding of this $170 million project. The D.E.M. was created in 2006 by legislation that combined the former Emergency Communications Department and the former Office of Emergency Services into one agency (Admin Code Sec. 2A.200). He retired in 2012.

References

External links
Brian Setencich official website

1962 births
Living people
Speakers of the California State Assembly
Republican Party members of the California State Assembly
California city council members
California politicians convicted of crimes